Tyson M. Campbell (born March 17, 2000) is an American football cornerback for the Jacksonville Jaguars of the National Football League (NFL). He played college football at Georgia. He was drafted by the Jaguars in the second round of the 2021 NFL Draft.

Early years
Campbell attended American Heritage School in Plantation, Florida. A five star recruit, he was ranked as the second-best cornerback recruit in the nation behind teammate Patrick Surtain II. He played in the 2018 U.S. Army All-American Bowl. Campbell committed to the University of Georgia to play college football.

College career
As a true freshman at Georgia in 2018, Campbell started 11 of 14 games, recording 45 tackles and a fumble recovery for a touchdown. As a sophomore he started three of nine games, missing five due to injury. He finished the year with 15 tackles, one sack, and a fumble recovery touchdown.

Professional career

Campbell was selected by the Jacksonville Jaguars in the second round (33rd overall) of the 2021 NFL Draft. Campbell signed his four-year rookie contract with Jacksonville on July 20, 2021. In his rookie season, he appeared in 15 games, of which he started 14. He finished with 73 total tackles, two interceptions, and ten passes defensed. In Week 17 of the 2022 season, Campbell had a 12-yard fumble recovery for a touchdown in the 31–3 victory over the Houston Texans. In the 2022 season, he started all 17 regular season games and both of the Jaguars' playoff games. He finished with 70 total tackles, three interceptions, 15 passes defensed, one forced fumble, and two fumble recoveries.

References

External links
Jacksonville Jaguars bio
Georgia Bulldogs bio

2000 births
Living people
People from Plantation, Florida
Players of American football from Florida
Sportspeople from Broward County, Florida
American football cornerbacks
Georgia Bulldogs football players
African-American players of American football
Jacksonville Jaguars players
21st-century African-American sportspeople
20th-century African-American sportspeople
American Heritage School (Florida) alumni